The 1990 season is the 4th season of the league that began on January 5, 1990, and concluded with the championship game on April 13.

Team movement
The Pittsburgh Bulls made their MILL debut in 1990, while the Washington Wave ceased operations.

Regular season

Playoffs

Awards

All-Pro Teams
First Team:
John Fay, New England
Brad Kotz, Philadelphia
Brian Nikula, Pittsburgh
Rick Sowell, Baltimore
John Tucker, Philadelphia
Ted Sawicki, Detroit (goalie)

Second Team:
Don Borges, New York
Toby Boucher, New England
Ron Martinello, Detroit
Dave Pietramala, Pittsburgh
Tim Welsh, Baltimore
Dan O'Neill, Boston (goalie)

Statistics leaders
Bold numbers indicate new single-season records. Italics indicate tied single-season records.

See also
 1990 in sports

References
1990 Archive at the Outsider's Guide to the NLL

Mill
Major Indoor Lacrosse League seasons